The Carnegie Library in Sheldon, Iowa is a building from 1908. It was listed on the National Register of Historic Places in 1977. In 1969, the library was moved and 7 years later the building became the Sheldon Prairie Museum.

References

Museums in Iowa
Library buildings completed in 1908
Libraries on the National Register of Historic Places in Iowa
Beaux-Arts architecture in Iowa
Buildings and structures in O'Brien County, Iowa
Sheldon, Iowa
National Register of Historic Places in O'Brien County, Iowa
1908 establishments in Iowa